Chelus is a genus of freshwater turtles found in South America.

Formerly considered to be a monotypic genus, it now consists of two species after Chelus orinocensis was identified in 2020 from a genomic analysis.

Species
Chelus fimbriatus
Chelus orinocensis

References